Nanna kamerunica is a moth of the subfamily Arctiinae. It was described by Lars Kühne in 2007. It is found in Cameroon.

References

 

Endemic fauna of Cameroon
Lithosiini
Moths described in 2007